A number of pieces of legislation are known as the Economy Act.

In the United States:

 the Economy Act of 1932, which established the purchasing authority of the federal government
 the Economy Act of 1933, part of Roosevelt's "New Deal". (38 U.S.C. § 701)

In the United Kingdom, a common name for either of:

 the Economy (Miscellaneous Provisions) Act 1926 (16 & 17 Geo. V c. 9)
 the National Economy Act 1931 (21 & 22 Geo. V c. 48)